René Féger (8 April 1904 – 30 August 1943) was a French sprinter. He competed in the men's 400 metres at the 1928 Summer Olympics.

References

1904 births
1943 deaths
Athletes (track and field) at the 1928 Summer Olympics
French male sprinters
French male middle-distance runners
Olympic athletes of France
Place of birth missing
20th-century French people